Zilair is an impact crater in the Argyre quadrangle of Mars, located at 31.81°S and 32.94°W. It is  in diameter and was named after Zilair, a town in Russia.

See also
 List of craters on Mars: O-Z

References 

Argyre quadrangle
Impact craters on Mars